Adrien Albert Marie, Comte de Mun (28 February 18416 October 1914), was a French political figure and Social Reformer of the nineteenth century.

Biography

Early years
Albert was born at Lumigny-Nesles-Ormeaux, Seine-et-Marne, son of the Marquis de Mun. He became a brother-in-law of the Duke of Ursel when his sister Antonine de Mun married him and left to live in Belgium.

He entered the French Army, saw service in Algeria (1862) and took part in the fighting around Metz in 1870 (during the Franco-Prussian War). On the surrender of Metz, he was sent as a prisoner of war to Aachen (Aix-la-Chapelle), where he met René de La Tour du Pin. They both were determined to respond to the dilemmas of the working class upon their release from prison. The following year they organized a Catholic Workers' club, under the name "L'Oeuvre des Cercles Catholiques d'Ouvriers" (Society of Catholic Worker Circles), at the request of Maurice Maignen (founder of the Brothers of St. Vincent de Paul). The clubs spread quickly throughout France. These "circles" or clubs brought together the wealthy and the workers from a given locale for prayer, socializing and lectures by members of the aristocracy. He also assisted in the recovery of Paris from the Paris Commune.

A fervent Roman Catholic, Albert devoted himself to advocating Social Catholicism. His attacks on Third French Republic's social policy ultimately gave rise to a prohibition from the Minister of War. He thereupon resigned his commission (November 1875) and in the following February stood as Royalist and Catholic candidate for Pontivy. The influence of the Church was exerted to secure his election and, during the proceedings, he was awarded the Order of Saint Gregory the Great by Pope Pius IX. He won the next elections for the same constituency, but the result was declared invalid. De Mun was re-elected however in the following August and for many years was the most conspicuous leader of the anti-Republican party. "We form", he said on one occasion, "the irreconcilable Counter-Revolution". He was also a resolute opponent of Socialism: "Socialism is logical Revolution and we are Counter-Revolution. There is nothing in common between us."

He was a prominent Anti-Dreyfusard as well as a committed antisemite who believed the Jews were plotting an international conspiracy and casually referred to them as youtres (French equivalent of "kikes").

Later years
As far back as 1878, he had declared himself opposed to universal suffrage, a declaration that lost him his seat from 1879 to 1881. He spoke strongly against the exile of the French princes (after the Count of Paris gave rise to suspicions that he was preparing to claim the throne), and it was chiefly through his influence that the support of the Royalist party was given to Georges Boulanger. But as a faithful Catholic, he obeyed the modernising encyclical of 1891, Rerum novarum, and declared his readiness to rally to a republican government, provided that it respected religion. In the following January, he received from Leo XIII a letter commending his actions and encouraging him in his social reforms.

He was defeated at the general election of that year, but in 1894 was elected in Finistère (Morlaix). In 1897, he succeeded Jules Simon as a member of the Académie française, owing to the quality and eloquence of his speeches which, with a few pamphlets, form the bulk of his published work. In Ma vocation sociale (1908) he wrote an explanation and justification of his career.

References

External links
 

1841 births
1914 deaths
People from Seine-et-Marne
Politicians from Île-de-France
Legitimists
Popular Liberal Action politicians
Members of the 1st Chamber of Deputies of the French Third Republic
Members of the 2nd Chamber of Deputies of the French Third Republic
Members of the 3rd Chamber of Deputies of the French Third Republic
Members of the 4th Chamber of Deputies of the French Third Republic
Members of the 5th Chamber of Deputies of the French Third Republic
Members of the 6th Chamber of Deputies of the French Third Republic
Members of the 7th Chamber of Deputies of the French Third Republic
Members of the 8th Chamber of Deputies of the French Third Republic
Members of the 9th Chamber of Deputies of the French Third Republic
Members of the 10th Chamber of Deputies of the French Third Republic
Members of the 11th Chamber of Deputies of the French Third Republic
French social reformers
Members of the Ligue de la patrie française
École Spéciale Militaire de Saint-Cyr alumni
Members of the Académie Française
French Roman Catholics